Daniel E. Gasman (1933 – 19 December 2012) was an American historian at John Jay College and the Graduate Center at City University of New York. He earned his PhD from University of Chicago in modern intellectual history. His most famous book is The Scientific Origins of National Socialism, which has been both praised and criticized by scholars. His second book, Haeckel's Monism and the Birth of Fascist Ideology, has been reviewed in journals.

Books
The Scientific Origins of National Socialism: Social Darwinism in Ernst Haeckel and the German Monist League (London and New York: Macdonald and American Elsevier, 1971) 
Haeckel's Monism and the Birth of Fascist Ideology (New York: Peter Lang: 1998)

References

External links
Daniel Gasman CV
From Haeckel to Hitler: The Anatomy of a Controversy
http://www.ferris.edu/isar/academic-controversies/gasman.htm

1933 births
2012 deaths
Historians of Germany
American historians
Graduate Center, CUNY faculty
John Jay College of Criminal Justice faculty
University of Chicago alumni